Ken Fleming is an American politician serving as a member of the Kentucky House of Representatives from the 48th district. Elected in November 2020, he assumed office on January 1, 2021. Fleming was previously a member of the Louisville Metro Council from 2003 to 2015 and the House from 2017 to 2019.

Early life and education 
Fleming earned a Bachelor of Business Administration from the University of Kentucky.

Career 
Prior to entering politics, Fleming worked as the president of the Management Association for Private Photogrammetric Surveyors and the executive director of Kilgore Samaritan Counseling Center in Louisville, Kentucky. He served as a member of the Louisville Metro Council from 2003 to 2015. In November 2016, he was elected to the Kentucky House of Representatives. In 2018, Fleming was narrowly defeated for re-election by Sorolis in a rematch. In 2020, Fleming defeated Sorolis in another close election and assumed office in January 2021.

References 

Year of birth missing (living people)
Living people
Louisville Metro Council members
University of Kentucky alumni
Republican Party members of the Kentucky House of Representatives
People from Louisville, Kentucky
Politicians from Louisville, Kentucky